This is a list of seasons completed by the West Virginia Mountaineers men's college basketball team.

Seasons

  In the 1934–35 season, West Virginia finished the Eastern Intercollegiate Conference season with a record of 6–2, tied for first place with Pittsburgh. The conference win–loss record for 1934–35 includes West Virginia′s subsequent loss to Pittsburgh in a conference championship playoff game, giving West Virginia a second-place finish for the season.

References

 
West Virginia Mountaineers
West Virginia Mountaineers basketball seasons